DigiWorld Economic Journal is a quarterly peer-reviewed academic journal that was established in 1991. It is published by DigiWorld Publishing and covers the socio-economic analysis of the telecom, information technology, and audiovisual sectors. The managing editor is Yves Gassot (IDATE, Montpellier, France).

Abstracting and indexing 
The journal is abstracted and indexed in:

External links

Quarterly journals
English-language journals
Publications established in 1991
Business and management journals